Riðill (sometimes anglicised to Rithill or Ridill) or Refil is a sword that appears in Norse Mythology, possessed by the dwarf Regin.

Under the guidance of Regin, Sigurd killed Fáfnir, Regin's older brother that had killed their father Hreiðmarr and monopolized his treasure. Afterward, Fafnir's heart was cut out and roasted for Sigurd and Regin to eat. According to Poetic Edda, Regin used Riðill to cut out Fafnir's heart. But in the Volsunga saga,  it is Sigurd who used Riðill and cut out the heart at that occasion.

In Skáldskaparmál, the name of Regin's sword is Refil.

References 

Mythological Norse weapons
Mythological swords